The 2022–23 Kansas State Wildcats men's basketball team represents Kansas State University in the 2022–23 NCAA Division I men's basketball season, their 120th basketball season. The Wildcats are led by first-year head coach Jerome Tang and play their home games in Bramlage Coliseum in Manhattan, Kansas as members of the Big 12 Conference.

Previous season
The Wildcats finished the 2021–22 season 14–17, 6–12 in Big 12 play to finish ninth place. They lost to West Virginia in the first round of the Big 12 tournament. 

On March 10, 2022, head coach Bruce Weber announced he was stepping down as head coach. On March 21, the school named longtime Baylor assistant Jerome Tang the team's new head coach.

Offseason

Departures

Incoming transfers

Recruiting classes

2022 recruiting class

2023 recruiting class

Roster

Schedule and results

|-
!colspan=12 style=| Exhibition

|-
!colspan=12 style=| Regular season

|-
!colspan=12 style=| Big 12 tournament

|-
!colspan=12 style=| NCAA Tournament

Source:

Rankings

See also 
 2022–23 Kansas State Wildcats women's basketball team

References

Kansas State Wildcats men's basketball seasons
Kansas State
2022 in sports in Kansas
Kansas
Kansas State